"Let Me Tickle Your Fancy" is a song recorded by American R&B singer Jermaine Jackson. It was released as the first single from his 1982 album, Let Me Tickle Your Fancy. It features the group Devo.

Charts

References

1982 songs
1982 singles
Jermaine Jackson songs